FK Comae Berenices is a variable star that varies in apparent magnitude between 8.14 and 8.33 over a period of 2.4 days. It is the prototype for the FK Comae Berenices (FK Com) class of variable stars. The variability of FK Com stars may be caused by large, cool spots on the rotating surfaces of the stars. This star is thought to be the result of a recent binary merger, resulting in a high rate of both spin and magnetic activity.

The spectral class of FK Comae Berenices is G4 III, although it is considered unusual in having very broad absorption lines as well as some emission lines.  The broadened spectral lines are due to rapid rotation.

The rotation rate of FK Comae Berenices is unusually fast for a cool giant star.  It is speculated that this is due to the merger of a contact binary pair of stars into a single star.  The rotation produces extremely strong magnetic fields which are expected to brake the star to a slower rotation rate.  Analysis of variability due to star spots on the surface show that the star rotates at different speeds at different latitudes.

FK Comae Berenices is listed as a companion to the slightly brighter HD 117567.  The two are not thought to be physically associated, with HD 117567 being a much closer F2 main sequence star.

References

External links
 FK Coma Berenices

Coma Berenices
117555
Comae Berenices, FK
G-type bright giants
FK Comae Berenices variables
065915
Durchmusterung objects